Linnea Quigley is an American actress, film producer, model, singer and author.

Feature films

Television

References

External links

Actress filmographies
American filmographies